Picturehouse are a band from Dublin, Ireland. The band are most famous for their song "Sunburst" from the album Karmarama in Ireland.

History
PictureHouse is the brainchild of Dave Browne. Originally signed to London Records in 1994, a rather tumultuous time resulted in the band returning to their native Dublin. They self-financed the release of their debut album "Shine Box". The album produced a number of popular singles such as "Somebody Somewhere", "The World and His Dog" and the smash hit "Heavenly Day". With success in their native Ireland the band toured with fellow Irish band The Saw Doctors on their UK tour in 1996. They later supported Bon Jovi in Dublin in the following year. Following this the band released 'Shine Box' across Europe following a distribution KOCH. The band toured the Nordic countries extensively in 1997.

Their second album 'Karmarama' was released in 1998 through the East-West label in Ireland. This release strengthened their presence in their native Ireland. "Sunburst" was the most played song on Irish radio in 1998, a multinational retail group put in the song in their TV campaign and the band played countless sold out shows including the legendary Olympia Theatre and the Point Depot. An award followed with Dave receiving "The Phil Lynott songwriting award" which was presented by Phil's mother in London.
 
More touring commenced, the band shared stages with the likes of Mel C, Texas, Meatloaf, Marillion and then an eventful arena tour with The Corrs. 2000 saw the band release the live album "Bring The House Down", again, self-released and in 2001 they set about making "Madness Sadness Gladness" with Adam Kviman in Sweden. Madness Sadness Gladness featured the massive single "Everybody Loves My Girl" -another summer smash in 2002. The pressure of constantly being self funded finally caved in and after the release of the tongue-in-cheekily titled singles collection "Get Yer Hits Out", the band went into hiatus.
 
Following 10-year hiatus the band were given the opportunity to begin songwriting with Lasse Anderson (Son of ABBA's Stig Anderson) produced a number of songs which Browne said "Sounded like PictureHouse". The result was "Evolution", which was released in Ireland in June 2013. Evolution features a new look PictureHouse, cowrites with Lasse Anderson and Graham Lyle, as well as appearances from Frankie Gavin of De Dannan and vocalist Ingrid Madsen.

They reformed with a brand new album "evolution" in June 2013. In February 2013 they asked fans to vote on the title of their new album. They voted to call it "Evolution". Following the success of the single Rules of Science which got considerable airplay in Ireland, The UK, Romania, Latvia, Cyprus and Indonesia, Cherry Red Records released a remastered, repackaged version of Evolution in 2014.

In 2017, they celebrated the 21st anniversary of Shine Box with a compilation album entitled "How Can I Explain How This Came To Be?" and a show in Dublin's National Concert Hall. as part of the celebrations, the band received plaudits from all round Ireland including Bono, Michael D Higgins, Ian Dempsey, Dustin The Turkey, Ray d'Arcy, Dermot and Dave, Keith Barry, Ken Doherty, Pat Shortt and The Coronas.

Discography

Studio albums

Irish charts

Compilations
Picturehouse performed a cover version of "Sweet Dreams My LA Ex" and a hidden track of "Papa Don't Preach" on Even Better than the Real Thing Vol. 1 and "Who's Gonna Ride Your Wild Horses" on "Even Better Than the Real Thing Vol. 3"

References

External links

Musical groups from Dublin (city)
Musical groups established in 1994
Power pop groups
Musical groups reestablished in 2013